Arthur Scargill (born 1938) is a British politician and former miners' trade union leader.

Scargill may also refer to:

 Scargill, County Durham, a hamlet in England
 Scargill, New Zealand, see Hurunui District#Populated places
 Scargill House, a Christian conference centre run by the Scargill Movement